Gerald Di Pego (born July 22, 1941) is an American screenwriter and producer.

Feature film screenplays
W (also known as I Want Her Dead), Cinerama, 1974
Sharky's Machine, Orion, 1981
Phenomenon, Buena Vista, 1996
Message in a Bottle, Warner Bros., 1999
Instinct, Buena Vista, 1999
Angel Eyes, Warner Bros., 2001
The Forgotten, Sony Pictures, 2004
Little Murder, Mind in Motion, 2011
Words and Pictures, Roadside Attractions, 2013

Television screenplays
 The Astronaut, ABC, 1972
 Short Walk to Daylight (also known as The Night the Earth Shook), ABC, 1972
 You'll Never See Me Again, ABC, 1973
 Runaway! (also known as The Runaway Train), ABC, 1973
 I Heard the Owl Call My Name, CBS, 1973
 The Stranger Who Looks Like Me, ABC, 1974
 Born Innocent, NBC, 1974 
 The Four Feathers, NBC, 1978
 A Family Upside Down, NBC, 1978
 Freedom Fighter, NBC, 1988
 The Trial of the Incredible Hulk, NBC, 1989
 Murder in Paradise, NBC, 1990
 The Death of the Incredible Hulk, NBC, 1990
 A Mom for Christmas, NBC, 1990
 Keeper of the City (based on his novel of the same title), Showtime, 1991
 Miracle Child, NBC, 1993
 One More Mountain, ABC, 1994
 A Silent Betrayal, CBS, 1994
 The Forget-Me-Not Murders (also known as Janek: The Forget-Me-Not Murders), CBS, 1994
 The Little Riders, The Disney Channel, 1996
 Keeping the Promise, CBS, 1997
 A Nightmare Come True, CBS, 1997
 Tempting Fate, ABC, 1998
 Phenomenon II, ABC, 2002

Television producer
The Sheriff and the Astronaut (pilot), CBS, 1984
Generation (pilot), ABC, 1985
The Trial of the Incredible Hulk (movie), NBC, 1989

References

External links

1941 births
American male screenwriters
American television writers
Living people
American film producers
American male television writers